Antsahampano is a town and commune in Madagascar. It belongs to the district of Antsiranana II, which is a part of Diana Region. According to 2001 commune census the population of Antsahampano was 7,624.

Antsahampano has a maritime harbour. Only primary schooling is available in town. The majority 60% of the population are farmers, while an additional 25% receives their livelihood from raising livestock. The most important crop is maize, while other important products are onions, rice and tomatoes.  Industry and services provide employment for 5% and 4% of the population, respectively. Additionally fishing employs 6% of the population.

References and notes 

Populated places in Diana Region